Gołuchowski (feminine: Gołuchowska; plural: Gołuchowscy) is a Polish surname. Notable people with this surname include:

 Agenor Maria Gołuchowski (1849–1921), Polish-Austrian politician
 Agenor Romuald Gołuchowski (1812–1875), Polish-Austrian politician
 Józef Gołuchowski (1797–1858), Polish philosopher

See also
 

Polish-language surnames